The , also known as River City 21 M, is a residential building in the River City 21 building complex in the Chūō special ward of Tokyo, Japan. Completed in March 1999, it is 180 m (590 ft) tall. It is the 45th tallest building in Tokyo and the 66th tallest building in Japan.

See also 
 List of tallest structures in Tokyo

References

Residential buildings completed in 1999
Residential skyscrapers in Tokyo
1999 establishments in Japan